CFR Title 45 - Public Welfare is one of fifty titles comprising the United States Code of Federal Regulations (CFR). Title 45 is the principal set of rules and regulations  issued by federal agencies of the United States regarding public welfare.

Structure 

The table of contents, as reflected in the e-CFR updated February 18, 2014, is as follows:

 45